Eric Russell Hutchinson (born 19 June 1965) is a former Australian politician who is the incumbent administrator of Norfolk Island, in office since 2017. He previously served a single term in the House of Representatives from 2013 to 2016, representing the Division of Lyons for the Liberal Party.

Early life
Hutchinson was born in Launceston, Tasmania. He worked for various wool-exporting companies before entering politics.

Politics
Hutchinson was elected to federal parliament at the 2013 election, when he won the Division of Lyons from incumbent Labor MP Dick Adams. He secured a 1.2-point margin from a swing of 13.5 points. He did not live in his electorate but in neighbouring Bass. He was defeated after one term by Labor's Brian Mitchell at the 2016 election. After his defeat, he took up a role as an advisor to the President of the Senate, Stephen Parry.

Administrator of Norfolk Island
On 1 April 2017, Hutchinson began a two-year term as Administrator of Norfolk Island, which was extended by a further two years in February 2019. In March 2020, during the COVID-19 pandemic, he declared a state of emergency on the island and imposed a 32-day travel ban. He was again reappointed for a two-year term beginning on 1 April 2021.

References

External links
 

1965 births
Liberal Party of Australia members of the Parliament of Australia
Living people
Members of the Australian House of Representatives for Lyons
Members of the Australian House of Representatives
Administrators of Norfolk Island
21st-century Australian politicians